The 2022 SRX race at Stafford  was a Superstar Racing Experience race that was held on July 2, 2022. It was contested over 75 laps on the  oval. It was the 3rd race of the 2022 SRX Series season. Ryan Newman took the lead late from Marco Andretti to earn his first SRX series victory.

Entry list

Heat races 
The heat races were held at 8:00 PM EST. The lineups for the 1st heat were determined by random selection. Following the 1st heat, the field is inverted for the 2nd heat. Points are awarded for each position, and the points set the field.

Heat Race 1

Heat Race 2

Starting Lineup

Race results

Main event

References 

2022 in sports in Connecticut
SRX Stafford round
2022 SRX